The Taranaki Open is an annual 72-hole golf tournament staged on the New Plymouth Golf Club's Ngamotu Links in New Plymouth, New Zealand. Between 2004 and 2007 it was an event on the Golf Tour of New Zealand while events since 2008 have been part of the Charles Tour. Prior to 2004 the tournament was run over two days, with 36 holes on each day.

Winners

Notes

References

Golf tournaments in New Zealand